Maurizio Delvecchio (born 22 May 1962) is an Italian painter. He was born in Basel, Switzerland into an Italian family.

Back in Italy, with his parents, he graduated from the Art School in Ravenna. In 1985 he graduated from the Academy of Fine Arts in Ravenna. He lives and works in Cesenatico (FC).

He participated in the 54 Biennale of Art in Venice in 2011.

Works in museums 
 Museo d'arte of Avellino (Italy)  with  Il Tramonto e l'attesa … (2013).
 Museo permanente di Arte Contemporanea of Amatrice (RI) (Italy).

References

Bibliography 
 (IT) A.A.V.V.(2008), Delvecchio. Silenziosamente - Sole al sole, Gesturist Cesenatico, Cesenatico 2008, pp. (44).
 (IT) TUROLA Gabriele (2005), Delvecchio. Il velo che copre le cose, Edizioni d'arte Coinè, Forlì 2005, pp. (24).

External links 
 biography from mauriziodelvecchio.it 

1962 births
Living people
20th-century Italian painters
Italian male painters
21st-century Italian painters
Artists from Basel-Stadt
People from Cesenatico
20th-century Italian male artists
21st-century Italian male artists